The second season of The Secret Life of the American Teenager, an American television series created by Brenda Hampton, debuted on the ABC Family television network on Monday, June 22, 2009 at 8:00PM. Season two regular cast members include Shailene Woodley, India Eisley, Daren Kagasoff, Francia Raisa, Kenny Baumann, Molly Ringwald, Mark Derwin, Megan Park, and Greg Finley II. Following the first season, Jorge Pallo and Luke Zimmerman were demoted to recurring guest stars. Jorge returned for a select number of episodes to wrap up his character's storyline and eventually departed the series after its January return.

Following the success of its first season, ABC Family announced on January 31, 2009, plans to renew Secret Life, following the cancellation of its hit sci-fi TV show, Kyle XY. The official press release was released on February 9 with ABC Family ordering 24 episodes for season two. Season 2 began with 12 episodes broadcast starting June 22, 2009. Though marketed as the season finale, the mid season finale aired on September 7, 2009, with the second half of the season returning on January 4, 2010. The second 12 episodes finished their run on March 22, 2010.

The season premiere of Secret Life brought in the largest audience for the show so far, with a record-breaking 4.68 million viewers. It brought in the second largest audience in adults 18-34 with 1.40 million viewers, behind season one's mid-season finale. 2.10 million adults 18-49 watched "The Big One" along with 1.60 million females between the ages 18–34. The season premiere remains the number one scripted original premiere of Summer 2009 in Adults 18-34. Furthermore, the mid-season premiere became ABC Family's most watched telecast of all time with viewers ages 12–34 with more than three million viewers watching. The mid-season premiere also brought in the show's second largest audience in total viewers, with more than 4.55 million people watching.

This season, Amy Juergens must deal with juggling motherhood and high school, while her family and friends experience relationship challenges of their own.

Main cast

 Shailene Woodley as Amy Juergens
 Kenny Baumann as Ben Boykewich
 Mark Derwin as George Juergens
 India Eisley as Ashley Juergens
 Greg Finley as Jack Pappas
 Daren Kagasoff as Ricky Underwood
 Megan Park as Grace Bowman
 Francia Raisa as Adrian Lee
 Molly Ringwald as Anne Juergens

Episodes

Development

Writing

Though it came as a surprise, writers of Secret Life were faced with a challenge when writing began for the second season. In January 2009, Molly Ringwald announced that she was expecting twins of her own. She told People Magazine that Brenda Hampton was working on writing her character's pregnancy into the storyline of the show.

Kenny Baumann, the actor who plays Ben Boykewich, confirmed that someone would die in the second season of Secret Life. The character would be a "significant male character" and the death would be a terrible tragedy. It was later revealed that John Schneider, who portrayed the role as Grace's father, Marshall, left the show due to multiple shows and projects he has. Marshall was written out of the series in "The Big One".

New and returning characters

Actor Brando Eaton was cast as Ashley's new gay sidekick, Griffin, who has a recurring role in the season. Actress Rumer Willis, appeared in Secret Life as Heather, a pregnant girl in the episode "Knocked Up Who's There?". She interacted with Ben in a way that got Amy jealous. Actor Austin Stowell was cast as Lauren's new boyfriend, Jesse, who has a recurring role in the season. Their relationship sparks the discussion of interracial dating, as Jesse believes that Lauren is not interested in having sex with him because of his race.

Reception

On Monday, June 22, 2009, Secret Life opened its second season with the largest audience so far, posting a series high in Total Viewers with 4.68 million viewers, and second-best numbers ever in Adults 18-34 with 1.4 million viewers, behind season one's mid-season finale, Adults 18-49 with 2.1 million viewers and Viewers 11-34 with 2.9 million viewers. In June 2009, Secret Life ranked as cable's No. 1 scripted telecast in Females 11-34, and the No. 1 scripted series telecast in Viewers 11-34 and Female Teens. Additionally, Secret Life stood as ad-supported cable's No. 1 telecast this month in Female Teens. Impressively, the season debut became cable's No. 1 scripted series premiere of the 2008/2009 season to date in Women 18-34, Women 18-49'and Viewers 11-34, and the No. 1 scripted original premiere of Summer 2009 so far in Adults 18-34.

Secret Life's second season debut now stands as cable's No. 1 scripted original series/season premiere this summer in Adults ages 18–34 and across core female 18-34, 18-49 and 11-34 demos, ahead of such high-profile series as USA's Royal Pains and Burn Notice and TNT's The Closer.

Some critics praised the new developments of the show, saying they could be "interesting material to build on." Jean Bentley of Entertainment Weekly says that with the whole "teen going through a pregnancy" plot being played out and the "frustrated young mother" thing is going on, we have room to explore some other topics. She remained hopeful that the writers won't just turn these new problems into issues of the week, instead allowing time for the characters to grieve Marshall's death, deal with Anne's accidental pregnancy, and explore the more emotionally complex aspects of teenage sex.

With more than 4.55 million people watching the season two mid-season premiere, the episode became ABC Family's most-watched telecast ever in key 12-34 and teen demos. The episode stands as the series' 2nd-most-watched episode in viewers and is TV's No. 1 telecast of the season in female teens, cable's No. 1 telecast in females 12-34 and cable's No. 1 scripted telecast in viewers 12-34. The season two mid-season premiere remains cable's No. 1 scripted premiere of the 2009/10 season. It improved nearly one million total viewers over its season two mid-season finale, and was No. 1 in all target demos for the hour.

References

External links
 Official website
 
 
 MSN

2009 American television seasons
2010 American television seasons
2